Greca (literally, Greek) is the term for the symbol of general rank or equivalent in the Italian Army, Italian Air Force, the Carabinieri and the Italian Navy. It is also used for those of high rank in the Vatican Gendarmerie and for generals in the military of San Marino. It is named after 'greca',  the Italian term for Greek key or meander. It resembles a double reversed letter W with a horizontal line across it.

References

Military insignia
Italian Army
Italian Air Force
Italian Navy